The Methodist Episcopal Church on 5th St., NE in Devils Lake, North Dakota was built in 1915.  It was designed by local architect Joseph A. Shannon.  It was listed on the National Register of Historic Places in 2008.

It is now the First United Methodist Church.

References

External links
First United Methodist Church, official website

Churches on the National Register of Historic Places in North Dakota
Romanesque Revival church buildings in North Dakota
Neoclassical architecture in North Dakota
Churches completed in 1915
Methodist churches in North Dakota
National Register of Historic Places in Ramsey County, North Dakota
1915 establishments in North Dakota
Neoclassical church buildings in the United States